Noah Dalton Danby (born April 24, 1974) is a Canadian actor. He is best known for portraying Connor King in the series Painkiller Jane.

Early life
Danby was born in Guelph, Ontario, the son of painter Ken Danby.

Personal life
Danby became engaged to his Painkiller Jane co-star Kristanna Loken on January 17, 2008. The two married at Loken's family's farm in Ghent, New York on May 10, 2008. In an interview published on November 16, 2009, Loken announced that she had separated from husband Danby and was in a relationship with a woman.

Filmography

Film

Television

Video games

References

External links
 
 

1974 births
Living people
Canadian male film actors
Canadian male models
Canadian male television actors
Canadian male voice actors
People from Guelph
Male actors from Ontario